Olivier Tchatchoua (born 4 April 1982) is a Cameroonian former professional footballer who played as a defender. He was part of the Cameroon national team at the 2001 FIFA Confederations Cup and has one international cap which he won in 2001.

References

External links

Living people
1982 births
Association football defenders
Cameroonian footballers
Cameroon international footballers
2001 FIFA Confederations Cup players
Sable FC players
Canon Yaoundé players